Alexandra Alina Dăscalu (born 17 April 1991) is a French female volleyball player who currently plays for Italian club Baronissi, as a right side hitter. She is also a member of the France women's national volleyball team. Her father, Pompiliu, is a retired volleyballer and current coach in France. Dăscalu's younger sister, Silvana, is also a volleyball player.

She competed at the 2011 Women's European Volleyball Championship.

Clubs
  Nantes Volley (2010–2013)
  Vannes Volley (2013–2015)
  Saint-Cloud Paris Stade français (2015–2018)
  Baronissi Volley (2018–present)

References

Sources

External links
 
 

1991 births
Living people
French women's volleyball players
French people of Romanian descent